

B
Harry Baujan,
Phil Bower,
Ed Brawley

C
Pete Calac,
Bunny Corcoran

G
Milt Ghee,
Joe Guyon

H
Bruno Haas,
Johnny Hendren

L
Bull Lowe

M
Joe Murphy

O
Dan O'Connor

P
Red Pearlman

S
Jake Stahl

T
George Tandy,
Jim Thorpe

W
Ralph Waldsmith,
Tom Whelan

Y
Frank A. Yocum

References
Pro Football Reference Cleveland Indians Roster

Cleveland Tigers (NFL)
 
Cleveland I
Indians (NFL) players